Mirai Chatterjee is a leader of the Self-Employed Women's Association, SEWA (India). She joined SEWA in 1984 and was its General Secretary after its Founder, Ela Bhatt.

Mirai Chatterjee is currently the Director of the Social Security Team at SEWA. She is responsible for SEWA's Health Care, Child Care and Insurance programmes. She was Chairperson of the National Insurance VimoSEWA Cooperative Ltd and the Lok Swasthya Health Cooperative, both of which she is a founder. Both cooperatives are promoted by SEWA. In addition, she is Chairperson of the Gujarat State Women's SEWA Cooperative Federation of 106 primary cooperatives with 300,000 members.

She was also appointed a member of National Advisory Council by the Prime Minister of India in June, 2010.

Ms. Chatterjee serves and has served on the Boards of several organizations in India, including the Friends of Women's World Banking (FWWB), and the Public Health Foundation of India (PHFI). She was advisor to the National Commission for Enterprises in the Unorganized Sector and is in the Advisory Group of the National Health Mission. She was also a Commissioner in the World Health Organization’s Commission on the Social Determinants of Health.

Chatterjee has a B.A. from Harvard University in History and Science and a Masters from Johns Hopkins Bloomberg School of Public Health.

Personal life 
Mirai Chatterjee is married to Binoy Acharya, Director UNNATI, an organisation committed to capacity building of grassroots communities. They have three daughters - Kaveri, Ilina and Tara.

Work experience
 2015—present Chairperson, Gujarat State Women's SEWA Cooperative Federation Ltd.
 2009—2019 Chairperson, National Insurance VimoSEWA Cooperative Ltd, with 100,000 insured women and their family members in five  states of India; currently Board Member
 1999—present Director, SEWA Social Security Team, involved in organising and managing health care, child care and insurance services for  women of the informal economy, all members of the Self Employed Women’s Association, SEWA
 1999—present Board Member, Lok Swasthya SEWA Health Worker’s Cooperative
 1999—2010 Chairperson, Lok Swasthya Health Workers’ cooperative, promoted by SEWA. The cooperative is a state-wide organization of grassroots-level health workers
 1996—1999 General Secretary, Self Employed Women's Association, SEWA; responsible for managing India's largest union of women workers  of the informal economy
 1984—1996 Coordinator, SEWA Health Team, involved in organising health services for and with informal women workers

Other experience 

 2020—present Chairperson, Women in Informal Employment Globalising and Organising (WIEGO), a global network of grassroot practitioners, policy-makers and researchers
 2020—present Board Member, Schwab Foundation for Social Entrepreneurship
 2014—present Vice-Chairperson, PRADAN, an NGO working on rural livelihoods
 2013—present Board Member, Save the Children (India)
 2010—2014 Member, National Advisory Council (NAC), appointed by the Prime Minister of India
 2010—2011 Member, High Level Expert Group on Universal Health Coverage, Planning Commission of India
 2009—present Board Member, Indian Institute of Public Health (Gujarat)
 2006—present Trustee, National Academy of Self-Employed Women
 2006—present Trustee, Strishakti Trust, SEWA Bank
 2006—present Board Member, Video SEWA Communication Cooperative
 2005—present Board Member, Public Health Foundation of India
 2005—2008 Commissioner, WHO's Commission on the Social Determinants of Health
 2005-2008 Board Member, Public Affairs Centre
 1999—2014 Board Member, Friends of Women's World Banking FWWB, Ahmedabad; an organisation committed to providing micro-finance to grass root women's organisations
 1998—present Trustee, Mahila SEWA Trust, an organisation committed to the welfare of women workers and a part of the SEWA movement
 1997—2000 Trustee, National Foundation for India, an organisation committed to strengthening voluntary action for development
 1988—1990 Board Member, Voluntary Health Association of India (VHAI) a national coalition of community health organisations
 1988—1989 President, Gujarat Voluntary Health Association (GVHA), regional coalition of health groups working involved in primary health care

Academic honours 

 1983—1985 Aga Khan Foundation Scholarship for 1983 – 85 for graduate degree in public health, Johns Hopkins University, USA
 1978—1982 Harvard University Scholarship
 1976—1978 Jawaharlal Nehru Memorial Scholarship to attend the United World College of the Atlantic, Wales

Other honours and appointments 

 Named in Apolitical's list of 100 Most Influential People in Gender Policy 2021
Global Achievement Award for Public Health, Johns Hopkins University School of Public Health, 2014
 Commissioner, Lancet Commission on Re-Imagining Health Care in India
 Commissioner, Lancet Commission on Oral Health
 Honours list of Earth Times Foundation, New York, for contribution to sustainable development
 Appointed as Member, National Advisory Council, June 2010 – May 2014
 Appointed to the National Commission on Enterprises in the Unorganised Sector, 2005
 Appointed as Commissioner, WHO Commission on Social Determinants of Health, March 2005 – 2008
 Member, Action Group on Community Action (AGCA), National Health Mission, Government of India (current)
 Member, India-EU Committee for Civil Society

Publications

Books and book chapters 

 Mental health and its social determinants: Some experiences of the Self-Employed Women's Association (SEWA) in India, chapter in Oxford Textbook of Public Mental Health, published by Oxford University Press (2018)
 Social protection in the changing world of work: experiences of informal women workers in India, chapter in Rethinking Informalisation: Poverty, Precarious Jobs and Social Protection, published by Cornell University (2005)

Selected journal articles and reports 

 Report of the Committee on Standalone Microinsurance Company, Insurance Regulatory and Development Authority of India (August 2020)
 Universal Health Care: A view from informal women workers in India, Global Social Policy, SAGE Publications (2020)
 Human resources for health in India, The Lancet (12-18 February 2011)
 Making health insurance work for the poor: Learning from the Self-Employed Women's Association's (SEWA) community-based health insurance scheme in India
 Equitable utilisation of Indian community based health insurance scheme among its rural membership: cluster randomised controlled trial (21 June 2007)
 Decentralised Childcare Services: The SEWA Experience, Economic and Political Weekly (2006)
 Barriers to accessing benefits in a community-based insurance scheme: lessons learnt from SEWA Insurance, Gujarat (22 December 2005)

Media articles 

 A lesson in Swaraj from Informal Women Workers, Hindustan Times, October 1, 2020 (https://www.hindustantimes.com/india-news/a-lesson-in-swaraj-from-informal-women-workers/story-9FPfjQex0Nr0fX10ldSScM.html)
 Lack of social security for women in the informal economy needs to be addressed, May 21, 2020, The Indian Express, https://indianexpress.com/article/opinion/columns/social-security-women-informal-economy-india-mirai-chatterjee-6419938/
 How Can We Ensure Social Security for Domestic Workers?, 16 April 2019, The Wire, https://thewire.in/labour/domestic-women-workers-informal-sector
 Informal Workers Are Bearing the Cost of Inadequate Healthcare Investment, February 21, 2019, The Wire, https://thewire.in/health/informal-workers-are-bearing-the-cost-of-inadequate-healthcare-investment
 As India rethinks labour rules, one item not on the agenda: Childcare facilities for women workers, 31 December 2018, Scroll.In, https://scroll.in/article/905727/as-india-rethinks-labour-rules-one-item-not-on-the-agenda-childcare-facilities-for-women-workers

References

Living people
Social workers
Members of National Advisory Council, India
Harvard University alumni
Johns Hopkins Bloomberg School of Public Health alumni
Scholars from Ahmedabad
Women educators from Gujarat
Educators from Gujarat
Social workers from Gujarat
21st-century Indian educational theorists
21st-century women educators
1959 births